Antaqucha (Quechua anta copper, qucha lake, "copper lake", Hispanicized spelling Antacocha) is a lake in Peru located in the Lima Region, Huarochirí Province, Huachupampa District.

What makes Antaqucha so special is its dam of pre-Inca times.

See also
List of lakes in Peru

References

Lakes of Peru
Lakes of Lima Region
Dams in Peru
Buildings and structures in Lima Region